Chelsea Emily Cutler (born February 11, 1997) is an American singer, songwriter, and producer from Westport, Connecticut. She released her debut studio album, How to Be Human, in January 2020 through Republic Records. It peaked at number 23 on the Billboard 200 chart.

Early life and education 
Chelsea Cutler was born and raised in Westport. Her father is Jewish and her mother is Catholic. She played acoustic musical instruments as a child moving into producing electronic music in high school. While in high school at the Pomfret School in 2014, Cutler began posting covers and original songs on her own SoundCloud. She continued posting music to SoundCloud while attending Amherst College in Massachusetts, where she also played varsity soccer. Cutler later decided to drop out of college to pursue music full-time after she was offered a support role on Quinn XCII's national tour in 2018.

Career 
By 2017, several of Cutler's songs (including "Your Shirt") garnered numerous streams and led to collaborations that year with acts including Louis the Child ("Slow Down Love"), Ayokay ("The Shine"), Kidswaste ("Tonight"), and Kasbo ("Found You"). She signed a record deal with Ultra Records in late 2017 and released her first EP, Snow In October. After touring with Quinn XCII in early 2018, Cutler released two independent mixtapes, Sleeping with Roses and Sleeping with Roses II. She also went on her first two nationwide headlining tours each in support of a mixtape, both of which sold out in advance.

In March 2019, she signed to Republic Records and released a joint EP, brent, with friend and label-mate Jeremy Zucker shortly after. The EP features the single "you were good to me", which they performed live on The Today Show. In May 2019, Cutler collaborated with Kygo on the single, "Not OK". It became her third collaboration (after "Slow Down Love" and "The Shine") to appear on the Billboard Dance/Electronic Songs chart, peaking at number 9.

In late 2019, Cutler began releasing new singles, including "How To Be Human" and "Lucky" (featuring Alexander 23). Along with "Sad Tonight", the songs served as the primary singles for her debut studio album, How To Be Human, released on January 17, 2020 by Republic Records. On January 23, 2020 she performed the lead single, "Sad Tonight", on Late Night With Seth Meyers. That song became Cutler's first entry on the Billboard Mainstream Top 40 airplay chart, peaking at number 32 in March 2020. In April 2020, she was featured alongside Quinn XCII on the Louis the Child track, "Little Things".

Cutler was slated to perform at Coachella 2020, which was canceled due to the COVID-19 pandemic. In June 2020, she released a version of her song "Crazier Things" which features Noah Kahan.

Discography

Studio albums

Live albums

EPs

Singles

As lead artist

As featured artist

Tours

Headlining 

 Sleeping with Roses Tour (2018)
 Sleeping with Roses Tour, Part II (2019)
 How To Be Human Tour (2020)
 Stay Next To Me Tour [with Quinn XCII] (2021)
 When I Close My Eyes Tour (2022)
 When I Close My Eyes Tour II (2022)

Livestream 

 Brent: Live On The Internet (2021) (with Jeremy Zucker) [changes due COVID-19 pandemic]
 A Night At The Drive In: Live On The Internet (2021) (with Quinn XCII) [changes due COVID-19 pandemic]

References

External links
Official website

1997 births
Living people
Republic Records artists
American women singers
American women songwriters
Record producers from Connecticut
Musicians from Connecticut
Ultra Records artists
21st-century American women